Jerry Wasserman (born November 2, 1945) is an American professor and film and television actor.

Wasserman was born in Cincinnati, Ohio. He is working on his role in Alien Trespass in post-production.

He is a Professor of English and Theatre at the University of British Columbia. He was also a frequent co-star of Don S. Davis. At Cornell University, he received a doctorate in English literature.

Edited works
Modern Canadian Plays (1985)
Spectacle of Empire: Marc Lescarbot’s Theatre of Neptune in New France (2006)
Theatre and AutoBiography: Writing and Performing Lives in Theory and Practice (2006) (with Sherrill Grace)

Filmography

References

External links

1945 births
Living people
American male film actors
American male television actors
Cornell University alumni
Male actors from Cincinnati
Academic staff of the University of British Columbia